USC Nouméa is a New Caledonian football team playing at the New Caledonia Second Level. It is based in Nouméa.  Their home stadium is Stade Numa-Daly.

Achievements
New Caledonia Division Honneur: 2
 1962, 1963

References

Football clubs in New Caledonia